Sunnyside is an unincorporated community in Castro County, Texas, United States. According to the Handbook of Texas, the community had an estimated population of less than 80 in 2000.

References

Unincorporated communities in Castro County, Texas
Unincorporated communities in Texas